Christian Brothers College Fremantle is an Independent Catholic secondary school for young men, located in Ellen Street site, in the coastal community surrounding Fremantle, Western Australia. The school traces its origins back to 1882, and in 1901 management responsibility was assigned to members of the religious order of the Christian Brothers. Teaching students in the tradition of Edmund Rice, the college caters for day students from Years 7 to 12, however in the past it was technically all ages.

Christian Brothers College (CBC) is associated with Edmund Rice Education Australia (EREA) and has been a member of the Associated & Catholic Colleges of Western Australia (ACC) since its inception in 1937.

The college does not have an official sister school, but maintains good relations with both Iona Presentation College located in Mosman Park and Santa Maria College in Attadale.

History 
The school's first building was opened in 1882 on High Street in the port town of Fremantle under the name Fremantle Catholic Boys' School in a building still standing on school grounds, which is now Blessed Edmund Chapel and used for College Liturgies and Masses. This building was constructed because the original school had outgrown St Patrick's Presbytery. The single story building was designed by a former Fenian convict, Joseph Nunan, an architect by profession who drew up the plans for the new school, and it was built using limestone. The foundation stone of Blessed Edmund Chapel was laid on 26 January 1882. The new school commenced with an enrolment of thirty primary-aged boys under the management of Otto De Grancy. It opened on 14 November 1883.

A change in the colony's Education Act in 1895 meant that all financial support for church-based schools was withdrawn. The recently arrived religious order of Christian Brothers was invited to take over the running of the parish school, and to establish a high school for the education of boys in the Fremantle area. In January 1901, the first group of brothers took charge of what was then known as St. Patrick's Boys' School. Thirty boys were enrolled but this number soon grew to ninety within four weeks. Soon afterwards, the High School opened with an enrolment of twenty-nine which soon rose to fifty-seven by the end of the year.

In 1905 a Public Schools Association was created in Western Australia which had only four members. Its purpose was to organise sporting contests between the schools but it also created an "elite" club as other similar schools were denied membership. CBC was a member with High School, Scotch College and Guildford Grammar School.

From 1901 to 1913, Christian Brothers' College Fremantle was one of half-a-dozen schools in Western Australia preparing students for public examinations for the University of Adelaide until the University of Western Australia opened in 1914 with two brother and two former CBC students among the first graduates.
In the last twenty years the school has become staffed by predominantly lay teachers, with 2002 seeing the appointment of the schools' first lay Principal, David McFadden. The years that followed saw CBC Fremantle undergo radical changes including the addition of a large gymnasium, new science labs, manual arts area, the renovation of the library, a new administration building and refurbishment of other key areas of the campus.

In October 2007, Edmund Rice Education Australia (EREA) took responsibility for the governance of CBC Fremantle along with forty other Edmund Rice schools, including Aquinas College and Trinity College.

Previous headmasters

House system
Like many other Australian schools CBC students are allocated to a house system, overseen by the head of house. Each of the six houses is named after a significant figure in the school community.

Campus 
The school is located in the heart of Fremantle. One of the oldest schools in Western Australia, the property on Ellen Street houses the junior and senior school, and overlooks Fremantle Park. The college has three heritage listed buildings including the administration building in which the Christian Brothers once lived.

Co-curriculum

Sport 
CBC Fremantle has been involved in the ACC Swimming, Athletics and Cross-County carnivals since its inception. Annually the interschool swimming team represent the college in the Quad Meet competing against Aquinas College, Hale School and Guildford Grammar School in preparation for the ACC "A" Division Carnival. Recent success includes winning the overall boys' shield at the ACC "A" Division Swimming, Cross Country and Athletics Carnivals.

CBC Fremantle Amateur Football Club
The CBC Old Boys Association fields 7 teams each Saturday to play against various other football clubs in the Western Australian Amateur Football League (WAAFL). The club was founded in 1932. It won the A Grade, A Reserves and A Colts Premiership treble in 2000 as well as grand final appearances in 2001, 2002 and 2003.

Arts 
The arts department hosts a jazz orchestra, guitar ensembles, rock band and various other stage and concert bands throughout the different year groups.

Uniform 
CBC has adopted a rather distinctive uniform that enables students to be easily recognised in the community. For all students in Years 7 to 11 the historic 'Victoria Grey' shirt is worn year round, in the summer terms (1 and 4) this is paired with dark grey shorts and grey socks with the school stripe. In the winter months (terms 2 and 3) students must wear the green blazer with matching green/bronze striped tie.
Year 12 students wear the same uniform, with the exception of a white shirt year round. The jazz orchestra wear a separate tie and when performing with a black blazer with bronze bands.

Notable alumni 
Tony Barber  — television presenter, radio announcer & singer
Martin Cattalini — NBL player Perth Wildcats, Adelaide 36ers
Brian Ciccotosto — WAFL football player
Cory Dell'Olio — AFL footballer Essendon Football Club
Cameron Edwards — soccer player Reading F.C. and Perth Glory player.
Ryan Edwards — soccer player at Reading F.C. and Perth Glory player
John Gerovich — WAFL football player immortalised in the bronze sculpture outside Fremantle Oval
Oliver Goss — Professional golfer
George Grljusich — football commentator
Tom Grljusich — WAFL football player
John Hughes — Perth businessman
Stephen Jurica - AFL footballer Richmond Football Club; Barrister
Jim McGinty — MLA for Fremantle; Attorney General
Sam Menegola — AFL footballer Geelong Football Club
J. J. Miller — champion jockey and horse trainer
David Neesham — Olympic water polo player
Gerard Neesham — WAFL & VFL football player and inaugural Fremantle Football Club coach
Con Regan — WAFL football player
Frederick Samson — Mayor of Fremantle, 1951–1972
Jacob Surjan — AFL footballer Port Adelaide Football Club
Peter Tagliaferri — Mayor of Fremantle, 2001–2009

References

External links
Official Website
EREA Official Website
Old Boys' Association

Catholic schools in Western Australia
Catholic secondary schools in Perth, Western Australia 
Educational institutions established in 1901
Congregation of Christian Brothers secondary schools in Australia
Heritage places in Fremantle
Ellen Street, Fremantle
State Register of Heritage Places in the City of Fremantle
1901 establishments in Australia